Charles Stuart Perry (11 March 1908 – 12 October 1982) was a New Zealand librarian. He was born in Melbourne, Victoria, Australia in 1908.

References

1908 births
1982 deaths
People from Melbourne
New Zealand librarians
Australian emigrants to New Zealand